The Mojotoro River, or Lavayen River (Spanish, Río Lavayén) is a river in the . It is a tributary of the San Francisco River. It is the natural north border of the municipality of Salta, the provincial capital.

The Mojotoro is born at the confluence of the Vaqueros River with the Wierna River, which flows along the Siancas Valley in La Caldera Department. When the river Mojotoro enters Jujuy Province, its name changes to Lavayén.

See also
 List of rivers of Argentina

References

Rivers of Salta Province
Rivers of Argentina
Tributaries of the Paraguay River